Parliamentary elections were held in Nigeria on 20 February 1999, following the annulling of the 1998 elections. The result was a victory for the People's Democratic Party, which won 59 of the 109 Senate seats and 206 of the 360 House seats. Voter turnout was 42.1%.

Results

Senate

Results by state 

 Abia State
 Adamawa State
 Akwa Ibom State
 Anambra State
 Bauchi State
 Bayelsa State
 Benue State
 Borno State
 Cross River State
 Delta State
 Ebonyi State
 Edo State
 Ekiti State
 Enugu State
 Gombe State
 Imo State
 Jigawa State
 Kaduna State
 Kano State
 Katsina State
 Kebbi State
 Kogi State
 Kwara State
 Lagos State
 Nasarawa State
 Niger State
 Ogun State
 Ondo State
 Osun State
 Oyo State
 Plateau State
 Rivers State
 Sokoto State
 Taraba State
 Yobe State
 Zamfara State

House of Representatives

Results by state
Bayelsa State
Federal Capital Territory
Katsina State
Kwara State
Nasarawa State
Taraba State

References

Nigeria
Parliamentary elections in Nigeria
Election and referendum articles with incomplete results